Bromelia is a genus of about 70 plant species widespread across Latin America and the West Indies. It is the type genus of the family Bromeliaceae, subfamily Bromelioideae, and its type species is B. karatas. Bromelia species are characterized by flowers with a deeply cleft calyx. The genus is named after the Swedish medical doctor and botanist  (1639-1705).

Species

Cultivation and uses
The resistant fiber obtained from B. serra and B. hieronymi, both known as chaguar, is an essential component of the economy of the Wichí tribe in the semi-arid Gran Chaco region of Argentina.  An 1841 publication described the fiber of silk grass (Bromelia karata) as "equal in durability to our best bowstrings."

References

External links

 List of Species at FCBS
 BSI Genera Gallery photos

 
Bromeliaceae genera